The Irish League in season 1892–1893 comprised 6 teams, and Linfield F.C. won the championship.

League standings

Results

References
Northern Ireland - List of final tables (RSSSF)

External links
 Irish Premier League Website
 Irish Football Club Project

1892-93
1892–93 domestic association football leagues
Lea